Colobocerus is a genus of flies in the family Dolichopodidae, known from New Zealand. It contains only one species, Colobocerus alchymicus.

References 

Dolichopodidae genera
Sympycninae
Diptera of New Zealand
Monotypic Diptera genera
Endemic insects of New Zealand
Taxa named by Octave Parent